Robin Hofman (born 3 May 1986) is a Dutch former professional footballer who played as a forward. He made one appearance in the Eerste Divisie for Excelsior Rotterdam.

References

1986 births
Living people
Footballers from Rotterdam
Dutch footballers
Association football forwards
Eerste Divisie players
Excelsior Rotterdam players